Trust for Nature is a not-for-profit organisation in the Australian state of Victoria which protects native plants and wildlife in co-operation with private landowners. The Trust was established under the Victorian Conservation Trust Act 1972 to enable people to contribute permanently to nature conservation by donating land or money. Trust for Nature has since evolved into one of Victoria's primary private land conservation organisations.

Purpose
"Victoria's most threatened native plants and wildlife are conserved for future generations." "We work collaboratively to protect nature on private land forever."

Conservation tools
Trust for Nature has developed five key mechanisms to achieve conservation gains on private land:

Conservation covenants: Private landowners protect quality native vegetation on their land by placing a covenant on the title, protecting the land in perpetuity. Trust for Nature developed conservation covenants in 1978 as a tool to protect native plants and wildlife on private land. Conservation covenants are backed by Victorian State legislation through the Victorian Conservation Trust Act 1972 and the Trust currently has more than 1,115 conservation covenants in effect which protects more than 47,000 hectares of private land. The Trust has also purchased and preserved more than 55 properties across Victoria through its Revolving Fund, as well as currently owning and managing 46 properties that cover over 36,000 hectares of Victoria.
Stewardship program:  Land management advice and information is provided to landowners who have covenanted their property.
Revolving fund: The Trust purchases land of high vegetation quality and on-sells the property with a covenant attached. Proceeds from the sale go back into the Revolving Fund.
Land acquisition:  Trust for Nature acquires land of high conservation value and manages it with the help of volunteers. Trust-owned properties are often used for open days and education purposes, demonstrating land conservation practices.
Markets: The Trust organises native vegetation offset agreements between private landowners and proponents who have an offset requirement. Landowners receive a payment from the proponent to improve native vegetation quality on their land.

Regions 
Trust for Nature operates within Victoria's ten catchment areas, often in partnership with the region's Catchment Management Authority (CMA).

The 10 CMA regions covering Victoria are:

Corangamite
East Gippsland
Glenelg Hopkins
Goulburn Broken
Mallee
North Central
North East
Port Phillip and Westernport
West Gippsland
Wimmera

References

External links
 Trust for Nature

Nature conservation organisations based in Australia
Natural history of Australia
Non-profit organisations based in Victoria (Australia)
Environmental organizations established in 1972
1972 establishments in Australia